Matterhorn Glacier is a small alpine glacier on the edge of the north wall of Taylor Valley, just west of the Matterhorn, on Roa Ridge in the Asgard Range of Victoria Land, Antarctica. It was named after the famous Swiss Matterhorn by U.S. geologist T.L. Pewe, who visited the area in December 1957.

References

Glaciers of McMurdo Dry Valleys